Milan Šajin (born 16 Mаy 1993) is a Serbian-born Qatari handball player who plays for RK Jugović and the Qatar men's national handball team.

References
 http://milansajin.blogspot.mk
 http://derbi.mk/metalurg-kje-se-zasili-so-reprezentativec-na-katar-video/milan-sajin/

1993 births
Living people
People from Vrbas, Serbia
Naturalised citizens of Qatar
Serbian male handball players
Qatari male handball players
Expatriate handball players